Many scholars and policymakers have noted that the fields of science, technology, engineering, and mathematics (STEM) have remained predominantly male with historically low participation among women since the origins of these fields in the 18th century during the Age of Enlightenment.

Scholars are exploring the various reasons for the continued existence of this gender disparity in STEM fields. Those who view this disparity as resulting from discriminatory forces are also seeking ways to redress this disparity within STEM fields (these typically construed as well-compensated, high-status professions with universal career appeal).

Gender imbalance in STEM fields 

Studies suggest that many factors contribute to the attitudes towards the achievement of young men in mathematics and science, including encouragement from parents, interactions with mathematics and science teachers, curriculum content, hands-on laboratory experiences, high school achievement in mathematics and science, and resources available at home. In the United States, research findings are mixed concerning when boys' and girls' attitudes about mathematics and science diverge. Analyzing several nationally representative longitudinal studies, one researcher found few differences in girls' and boys' attitudes towards science in the early secondary school years. Students' aspirations to pursue careers in mathematics and science influence both the courses they choose to take in those areas and the level of effort they put forth in these courses.

A 1996 USA study suggested that girls begin to lose self-confidence in middle school because they believe that men possess more intelligence in technological fields. The fact that men outperform women in spatial analysis, a skillset many engineering professionals deem vital, generates this misconception. Feminist scholars postulate that boys are more likely to gain spatial skills outside the classroom because they are culturally and socially encouraged to build and work with their hands. Research shows that girls can develop these same skills with the same form of training.

A 1996 USA study of college freshmen by the Higher Education Research Institute shows that men and women differ greatly in their intended fields of study. Of first-time college freshmen in 1996, 20 percent of men and 4 percent of women planned to major in computer science and engineering, while similar percentages of men and women planned to major in biology or physical sciences. The differences in the intended majors between male and female first-time freshmen directly relate to the differences in the fields in which men and women earn their degree. At the post-secondary level, women are less likely than men to earn a degree in mathematics, physical sciences, or computer sciences and engineering. The exception to this gender imbalance is in the field of life science.

Effects of underrepresentation of women in STEM careers 
In Scotland, a large number of women graduate in STEM subjects but fail to move onto a STEM career compared to men. The Royal Society of Edinburgh estimates that doubling women's high-skill contributions to Scotland's economy would benefit it by £170 million per annum.

A 2017 study found that closing the gender gap in STEM education would have a positive impact on economic growth in the EU, contributing to an increase in GDP per capita of 0.7–0.9% across the bloc by 2030 and of 2.2–3.0% by 2050.

Men's and women's earnings 

Female college graduates earned less on average than male college graduates, even though they shared the earnings growth of all college graduates in the 1980s. Some of the differences in salary are related to the differences in occupations entered by women and men. Among recent science and engineering bachelor's degree recipients, women were less likely than men to be employed in science and engineering occupations. There remains a wage gap between men and women in comparable scientific positions. Among more experienced scientists and engineers, the gender gap in salaries is greater than for recent graduates. Salaries are highest in mathematics, computer science, and engineering, which are fields in which women are not highly represented. In Australia, a study conducted by the Australian Bureau of Statistics has shown that the current gender wage gap between men and women in STEM fields in Australia stands at 30.1 percent as of 2013, which is an increase of 3 percent since 2012. In addition, according to a study done by Moss, when faculty members of top research institutions in America were asked to recruit student applicants for a laboratory manager position, both men and women faculty members rated the male applicants as more hireable and competent for the position, as opposed to the female applicants who shared an identical resume with the male applicants. In the Moss study, faculty members were willing to give the male applicants a higher starting salary and career mentoring opportunities.

Education and perception
The percentage of PhDs in STEM fields in the U.S. earned by women is about 42%, whereas the percentage of PhDs in all fields earned by women is about 52%. Stereotypes and educational differences can lead to the decline of women in STEM fields. These differences start as early as the third grade according to Thomas Dee, with boys advancing in math and science and girls advancing in reading.

Representation of women worldwide 

UNESCO, among other agencies including the European Commission and The Association of Academies and Societies of Sciences in Asia (AASSA), have been outspoken about the underrepresentation of women in STEM fields globally.

Despite their efforts to compile and interpret comparative statistics, it is necessary to exercise caution. Ann Hibner Koblitz has commented on the obstacles regarding the making of meaningful statistical comparisons between countries:

Even when different countries use the same definitions of terms, the social significance of the categories may differ considerably. Koblitz remarks:

Africa
According to UNESCO statistics, 30% of the Sub-Saharan tech workforce are women; this share rose to 33.5 percent in 2018. South Africa features among the top 20 countries in the world for the share of professionals with skills in artificial intelligence and machine learning, with women representing 28 percent of these South African professionals.

Asia 

A fact sheet published by UNESCO in March 2015 presented worldwide statistics of women in the STEM fields, with a focus on Asia and the Pacific region. It reports that, worldwide, 30 percent of researchers are women; as of 2018, this share had increased to 33 percent. In these areas, East Asia, the Pacific, South Asia and West Asia had the most uneven balance, with 20 percent of researchers being women in each of those sub-regions. Meanwhile, Central Asia had the most equal balance in the region, with women comprising 46 percent of its researchers. The Central Asian countries Azerbaijan and Kazakhstan were the only countries in Asia with women as the majority of their researchers, though in both cases it was by a very small margin.

Cambodia 
As at 2004, 13.9% of students enrolled in science programs in Cambodia were female and 21% of researchers in science, technology, and innovation fields were female as of 2002. These statistics are significantly lower than those of other Asian countries such as Malaysia, Mongolia, and South Korea. According to a UNESCO report on women in STEM in Asian countries, Cambodia's education system has a long history of male dominance stemming from its male-only Buddhist teaching practices. Starting in 1924, girls were allowed to enroll in school. Bias against women, not only in education but in other aspects of life as well, exists in the form of traditional views of men as more powerful and dignified than women, especially in the home and in the workplace, according to UNESCO's A Complex Formula.

Indonesia 
UNESCO's A Complex Formula states that Indonesia's government has been working towards gender equality, especially through the Ministry of Education and Culture, but stereotypes about women's roles in the workplace persist. Due to traditional views and societal norms, women struggle to remain in their careers or to move up in the workplace. Substantially more women are enrolled in science-based fields such as pharmacy and biology than in mathematics and physics. Within engineering, statistics vary based on the specific engineering discipline; women make up 78% of chemical engineering students but only 5% of mechanical engineering students. As of 2005, out of 35,564 researchers in science, technology, and engineering, only 10,874 or 31% were female.

Japan
According to OECD data, about 25 percent of enrollment in STEM-related programs at the tertiary education level in Japan are women.

Kazakhstan
According to OECD data, about 66 percent of enrollment in STEM-related programs at the tertiary education level in Kazakhstan are women.

Malaysia 
According to UNESCO, 48.19% of students enrolled in science programs in Malaysia were female as of 2011. This number has grown significantly in the past three decades, during which the country's employment of women has increased by 95%. In Malaysia, over 50% of employees in the computer industry, which is generally a male-dominated field within STEM, are women. Of students enrolled in pharmacy, more than 70% are female, while in engineering only 36% of students are female. Women held 49% of research positions in science, technology, and innovation as of 2011.

Mongolia 
According to UNESCO's data from 2012 and 2018 respectively, 40.2% of students enrolled in science programs and 49% of researchers in science, technology, and innovation in Mongolia are female. Traditionally, nomadic Mongol culture was fairly egalitarian, with both women and men raising children, tending livestock, and fighting in battle, which mirrors the relative equality of women and men in Mongolia's modern-day workforce. More females than males pursue higher education and 65% of college graduates in Mongolia are women. However, women earn about 19–30% less than their male counterparts and are perceived by society to be less suited to engineering than men. Thirty percent or less of employees in computer science, construction architecture, and engineering are female while three in four biology students are female.

Nepal 
As of 2011, 26.17% of Nepal's science students were women and 19% of their engineering students were also women. In research, women held 7.8% of positions in 2010. These low percentages correspond with Nepal's patriarchal societal values. In Nepal, women that enter STEM fields most often enter forestry or medicine, specifically nursing, which is perceived as a predominantly female occupation in most countries.

South Korea 
In 2012, 30.63% of students who enrolled in science programs in South Korea were female, a number that has been increasing since the digital revolution. Numbers of male and female students enrolled at most levels of education are comparable as well, though the gender difference is larger in higher education. Confucian beliefs in the lower societal value of women as well as other cultural factors could influence South Korea's STEM gender gap. In South Korea, as in other countries, the percentage of women in medicine (61.6%) is much higher than the percentage of women in engineering (15.4%) and other more math-based stem fields. In research occupations in science, technology, and innovation, women made up 17% of the workforce as of 2011. In South Korea, most women working in STEM fields are classified as "non-regular" or temporary employees, indicating poor job stability. In a study conducted by the University of Glasgow which examined math anxiety and test performance of boys and girls from various countries, researchers found that South Korea had a high sex difference in mathematics scores, with female students scoring significantly lower than and experiencing more math anxiety on math tests than male students.

Thailand
According to OECD data, about 53 percent of enrollment in STEM-related programs at the tertiary education level in Thailand are women.

Gulf Cooperation Council States 
Ann Hibner Koblitz reported on a series of interviews conducted in 2015 in Abu Dhabi with women engineers and computer scientists who had come to the United Arab Emirates and other Gulf states to find opportunities that were not available to them in their home country.  The women spoke of a remarkably high level of job satisfaction and relatively little discrimination.  Koblitz comments that

Central and South America
Nearly half of PhD degrees pursued in Central and South America are completed by women (2018). However, only a small minority is represented at decision-making levels.

A 2018 study gathered 6,849 articles published in Latin America and found that women researchers were 31% of published researchers in 2018, an increase from 27% in 2002. The same study also found that when women lead the research group, women contributors were published 60%, compared to when men are the leaders and the women contributors were published 20%.

When looking at over 1,500 articles related to Botany published in Latin America, a study found that participation from both women and men were equal, whether it be in publications or leading roles in scientific organizations. Also women had higher rates of publication in Argentina, Brazil, and Mexico when compared to other Latin American countries despite participation being nearly the same throughout the region. Although women have higher publications in Botany, men still out publish women and are often the ones cited in research papers and studies relating to the sciences.

The study concluded that according to the data (shown in the table above), women in Chile that are enrolled in STEM have higher enrollment in the sciences closely related to Biology and Medicine than other sciences in the technological field. After graduation women made up 67.70% of the workers in Engineering in Health and 59.80% of workers in Biomedical Engineering. While in other fields, such as Mechanical Engineering or Electrical Engineering (the more technical fields), men dominated the workforce with over 90% of workers being male.

Europe

In the European Union only 16.7% on average of ICT (Information and communication technology) specialists are women. Only in Romania and Bulgaria do women hold more than 25 percent of these roles. The gender distribution is more balanced, particularly in new member states when taking into account ICT technicians (middle and low-ranking positions).

In 2012, the percentage of women PhD graduates was 47.3% of the total, 51% of the social sciences, business and law, 42% of the science, mathematics and computing, and just the 28% of PhD graduates in engineering, manufacturing and construction. In the computing subfield only 21% of PhD graduates were women. In 2013 in the EU as an average men scientists and engineers made up 4.1% of total labour force, while women made up only 2.8%. In more than half of the countries women make up less than 45% of scientists and engineers. The situation has improved, as between 2008 and 2011 the number of women amongst employed scientists and engineers grew by an average of 11.1% per year, while the number of men grew only by 3.3% over the same period.

In 2015, in Slovenia, Portugal, France, Sweden, Norway, and Italy there were more boys than girls taking advanced courses in mathematics and physics in secondary education in Grade 12.

In 2018, European Commissioner for Digital Economy and Society Mariya Gabriel announced plans to increase the participation of women in the digital sector by challenging stereotypes; promoting digital skills and education and advocating for more women entrepreneurs.
In 2018, Ireland took the step of linking research funding from the Higher Education Authority to an institution’s ability to reduce gender inequality.

North America

United States 
According to the National Science Foundation, women comprise 43 percent of the U.S. workforce for scientists and engineers (S&E) under 75 years old. For those under 29 years old, women comprise 56% of the science and engineering workforce. Of scientists and engineers seeking employment, 50% under 75 are women, and 49% under 29 are women. About one in seven engineers are female. However, women comprise 28% of workers in S&E occupations - not all women who are trained as S&E are employed as scientists or engineers. Women hold 58% of S&E related occupations.

Women in STEM fields earn considerably less than men, even after controlling for a wide set of characteristics such as education and age. On average, men in STEM jobs earn $36.34 per hour while women in STEM jobs earn $31.11 per hour.

There are many reasons why gender pay gaps in STEM fields continue to exist which include women choosing STEM majors that pay less. However, even with the same degree, women still earned less. A research study on starting pay with an engineering degree found that women earned less than $61,000 while men earned more than $65,000. 

Women dominate the total number of persons with bachelor's degrees, as well as those in STEM fields defined by the National Center for Education Statistics. However, they are underrepresented in specific fields including Computer Sciences, Engineering, and Mathematics. Along with women, racial/ethnic minorities in the United States are also underrepresented in STEM.

Asian women are well represented in STEM fields in the U.S.(though not as much as males of the same ethnicity) compared to African American, Hispanic, Pacific Islander, and Native American women. Within academia, these minority women represent less than 1% of tenure-track positions in the top 100 U.S. universities despite constituting approximately 13% of total US population. A 2015 study suggested that attitudes towards hiring women in STEM tenure track positions has improved, with a 2:1 preference for women in STEM after adjusting for equal qualifications and lifestyles (e.g., single, married, divorced).

African American women 
According to Kimberly Jackson, prejudice and assumed stereotypes keep women of color, especially black women from studying in STEM fields. Psychologically, stereotypes on black women's intellect, cognitive abilities, and work ethic contribute to their lack of confidence in STEM. Some schools, such as Spelman College, have made attempts to change perceptions of African-American women and improve their rates of becoming involved and technically proficient in STEM. Students of color, especially Black students, face difficulty in STEM majors as they face hostile climates, microaggressions, and a lack of support and mentorship.

Latin American women 
A 2015 NCWIT study estimated that Latin American women represented only 1% of the US tech workforce. A 2018 study on 50 Latin American women who founded a technology company indicated that 20% were Mexican, 14% bi-racial, 8% unknown, 4% Venezuelan.

Canada 
A Statistics Canada study from 2019 found that first-year women make up 44% of STEM students, compared with 64% of non-STEM students. Those women who transfer out of STEM courses usually go to a related field, such as health care or finance. A study conducted by the University of British Columbia discovered that only 20–25% of computer science students from all Canadian colleges and universities are women. As well, only about 1 in 5 of that percentage will graduate from those programs.

Statistically, women are less likely to choose a STEM program, regardless of mathematical ability. Young men with lower marks in mathematics are more likely to pursue STEM fields than their women-identified peers with higher marks in mathematics.

Oceania

Australia 
Australia has only recently made significant attempts to promote participation of women in STEMM disciplines, including the formation of Women in STEMM Australia in 2014, a non-profit organisation that aims at connecting women in STEMM disciplines in a coherent network. Similarly, the STEM Women directory has been established to promote gender equity by showcasing the diversity of talent in Australian women in STEM fields. In 2015, the SAGE (Science in Australia Gender Equity) was started as a joint venture of the Australian Academy of Science and the Australian Academy of Technology and Engineering. The program is tasked with implementing a pilot of the Athena SWAN accreditation framework within Australian higher education institutions.

Underrepresentation in STEM-related awards and competitions 
In terms of the most prestigious awards in STEM fields, fewer have been awarded to women than to men. Between 1901 and 2017 the female:total ratio of Nobel Prizes were 2:207 for physics, 4:178 for chemistry, 12:214 for physiology/medicine, and 1:79 for economic sciences.
The ratios for other fields were 14:114 in literature and 16:104 for peace. Maryam Mirzakhani was the first woman and first Iranian to receive the Fields Medal in 2014. The Fields Medal, is one of the most prestigious prize in mathematics, and has been awarded 56 times in total.

Fewer female students participate in prestigious STEM-related competitions such as the International Mathematical Olympiad. In 2017, only 10% of the IMO participants were female and there was one female on the South Korean winning team of six.

Recent advances in technology

Abbiss states that "the ubiquity of computers in everyday life has seen the breaking down of gender distinctions in preferences for and the use of different applications, particularly in the use of the internet and email." Both genders have acquired skills, competencies and confidence in using a variety of technological, mobile and application tools for personal, educational and professional use at high school level, but the gap still remains when it comes to enrollment of girls in computer science classes, which declines from grades 10 to 12. For higher education programs in information and communications technology, women make up only 3% of graduates globally.

A review of UK patent applications, in 2016, found that the proportion of new inventions registered by women was rising, but that most female inventors were active in stereotypically female fields such as "designing bras and make-up". 94% of inventions in the field of computing, 96% in automotive applications and mining, and 99% in explosives and munitions, were by men. In 2016 Russia had the highest percentage of patents filed by women, at about 16%.

Explanations for low representation of women 
There are a variety of proposed reasons for the relatively low numbers of women in STEM fields. These can be broadly classified into societal, psychological, and innate explanations. However, explanations are not necessarily restricted to just one of these categories.

Societal

Discrimination
This leakage may be due to discrimination, both overt and covert, faced by women in STEM fields. According to Schiebinger, women are twice as likely to leave jobs in science and engineering than men are. In the 1980s, researchers demonstrated a general evaluative bias against women.

In a 2012 study, email requests were sent to meet to professors in doctoral programs at the top 260 U.S. universities. It was impossible to determine whether any particular individual in this study was exhibiting discrimination, since each participant only viewed a request from one potential graduate student. However, researchers found evidence for discrimination against ethnic minorities and women relative to Caucasian men. In another study, science faculty were sent the materials of students who were applying for a lab manager position at their university. The materials were the same for each participant, but each application was randomly assigned either a male or a female name. The researchers found that faculty members rated the male candidates as both more competent and more hirable than the female candidates, despite applications being otherwise identical. If individuals are given information about a prospective student's gender, they may infer that he or she possesses traits consistent with stereotypes for that gender. A study in 2014 found that men are favored in some domains, such as tenure rates in biology, but that the majority of domains were gender-fair. The authors interpreted this to suggest that the underrepresentation of women in the professorial ranks was not solely caused by sexist hiring, promotion, and remuneration.

Audery Azoulay, UNESCO Chief, stated that even in, "21st century, women and girls are sidelined in science-related fields due to their gender." A 2017 survey showed that women working in the STEM fields are more likely to experience workplace discrimination than men. Around half of the women in the STEM profession have experienced gender-based discrimination, such as the man being paid more for the same job, being treated like they do not qualify for the job, or being mocked or insulted. Some women also stated that in a workplace where most employees were male, they felt that being  a woman was a barrier to their success.

Stereotypes 
Stereotypes about what someone in a STEM field should look and act like may cause established members of these fields to overlook individuals who are highly competent. The stereotypical scientist or individual in another STEM profession is usually thought to be male. Women in STEM fields may not fit individuals' conception of what a scientist, engineer, or mathematician "should" look like and may thus be overlooked or penalized. The Role Congruity Theory of Prejudice states that perceived incongruity between gender and a particular role or occupation can result in negative evaluations. In addition, negative stereotypes about women's quantitative abilities may lead people to devalue their work or discourage these women from continuing in STEM fields.

Both men and women who work in "nontraditional" occupations may encounter discrimination, but the forms and consequences of this discrimination are different. Individuals of a particular gender are often perceived to be better suited to particular careers or areas of study than those of the other gender. A study found that job advertisements for male-dominated careers tended to use more agentic words (or words denoting agency, such as "leader" and "goal-oriented") associated with male stereotypes. Social Role Theory, proposed in 1991, states that men are expected to display agentic qualities and women to display communal qualities. These expectations can influence hiring decisions. A 2009 study found that women tended to be described in more communal terms and men in more agentic terms in letters of recommendation. These researchers also found that communal characteristics were negatively related to hiring decisions in academia.

Although women entering traditionally male professions face negative stereotypes suggesting that they are not "real" women, these stereotypes do not seem to deter women to the same degree that similar stereotypes may deter men from pursuing nontraditional professions. There is historical evidence that women flock to male-identified occupations once opportunities are available. On the other hand, examples of occupations changing from predominantly female to predominantly male are very rare in human history. The few existing cases—such as medicine—suggest that redefinition of the occupations as appropriately masculine is necessary before men will consider joining them.

Although men in female-dominated occupations may contend with negative stereotypes about their masculinity, they may also experience certain benefits. In 1992 it was suggested that women in male-dominated occupations tended to hit a glass ceiling; while men in female-dominated occupations may hit a "glass escalator". While the glass ceiling can make it difficult for women and minorities to reach the top of an occupation, the "glass escalator" allows men to excel in a profession that is female dominated.

Black Sheep effect

The Black Sheep effect occurs when individuals are likely to evaluate members of their in-group more favorably than members of their out-group when those members are highly qualified. However, when an individual's in-group members have average or below average qualities, they are likely to evaluate them much lower than out-group members with equivalent qualifications. This suggests that established women in STEM fields will be more likely than established men to help early career women who display sufficient qualifications. However, established women will be less likely than men to help early career women who display insufficient qualifications.

Queen Bee effect
The Queen Bee effect is similar to the Black Sheep effect but applies only to women. It explains why higher-status women, particularly in male-dominated professions, may actually be far less likely to help other women than their male colleagues might be. A 2004 study found that while doctoral students in a number of different disciplines did not exhibit any gender differences in work commitment or work satisfaction, faculty members at the same university believed that female students were less committed to their work than male students. What was particularly surprising was that these beliefs by faculty members were most strongly endorsed by female faculty members, rather than male faculty members. One potential explanation for this finding is that individual mobility for a member of a negatively stereotyped group is often accompanied by a social and psychological distancing of oneself from the group. This implies that successful women in traditionally male-dominated careers do not see their success as evidence that negative stereotypes about women's quantitative and analytical abilities are wrong, but rather as proof that they personally are exceptions to the rule. Thus, such women may actually play a role in perpetuating, rather than abolishing, these negative stereotypes.

Mentorship
In STEM fields, the support and encouragement of a mentor can make a lot of difference in women's decisions of whether or not to continue pursuing a career in their discipline. This may be particularly true for younger individuals who may face many obstacles early on in their careers. Since these younger individuals often look to those who are more established in their discipline for help and guidance, the responsiveness and helpfulness of potential mentors is incredibly important.
There are many emerging mentorship programs. However, many women experience harassment from their mentors which can cause them to be unable to finish the program among many other issues.

A 2020 study surveyed women who are working in STEM field and live in the U.S, Northeast, and Eastern Canada. Most women reported  that finding a mentor at their workplace was complex, and only a third of the women had some sort of mentor, formal or informal. During their time in school , half of the participants were able find a professor to be their mentor. They added that mentorship helped them complete their degree and guided them from the educational sphere to the workplace. The majority of the women agreed that mentorship is a crucial resource, and many want to be involved in mentorship, but there are not enough resources or opportunities in their work environment.

Lack of support
Women in STEM may leave due to not being invited to professional meetings, the use of sexually discriminating standards against women, inflexible working conditions, the perceived need to hide pregnancies, and the struggle to balance family and work. Women in STEM fields that have children either need child care or to take a long leave of absence. When a nuclear family can not afford child care, typically it is the mother that gives up her career to stay at home with the children. This is due in part to women being paid statistically less in their careers. The man makes more money so the man goes to work and the woman gives up her career. Maternity leave is another issue women in STEM fields face. In the U.S., maternity leave is required by The Family and Medical Leave Act of 1993 (FMLA). The FMLA requires 12 weeks of unpaid leave annually for mothers of newborn or newly adopted children. This is one of the lowest levels of leave in the industrialized world. All developed countries except the United States guarantee mothers at least some paid time off. If a new mother does not have external financial support or savings, they may not be able to take their full maternity leave. Few companies allow men to take paternity leave and it may be shorter than women's maternity leave. Longer paternity leaves for men could allow women to go back to work while their partners stay home with the children.

Harassment 
In 1993, The New England Journal of Medicine indicated that three-quarters of women students and residents were harassed at least once during their medical training. The 2020 Tribeca Film Festival documentary, "Picture a Scientist", highlighted the severe sexual and physical harassment women in STEM fields can face, often without adequate recourse. In that film Jane Willenbring, a female scientist and associate professor at Scripps Institution of Oceanography, shared how she was harassed by her mentor David R. Marchant during her fieldwork. She was called many demeaning names, harassed when using the bathroom, and even had shards of volcanic sand blown into her eyes.

Lack of role models 
In engineering and science education, women made up almost 50 percent of non-tenure track lecturer and instructor jobs, but only 10 percent of tenured or tenure-track professors in 1996. In addition, the number of female department chairs in medical schools did not change from 1976 to 1996. Moreover, women who do make it to tenured or tenure-track positions may face the difficulties associated with holding a token status. They may lack support from colleagues and may face antagonism from peers and supervisors. Research has suggested that women's lack of interest may in part stem from stereotypes about employees and workplaces in STEM fields, to which stereotypes women are disproportionately responsive.

Clustering and leaky pipeline 
In the early 1980s, Rossiter put forth the concept of "territorial segregation" or occupational segregation, which is the idea that women "cluster" in certain fields of study. For example, "women are more likely to teach and do research in the humanities and social sciences than in the natural sciences and engineering", and the majority of college women tend to choose majors such as psychology, education, English, performing arts, and nursing.

Rossiter also used "hierarchical segregation" as an explanation for the low number of women in STEM fields. She describes "hierarchical segregation" as a decrease in the number of women as one "moves up the ladder of power and prestige." This is related to the leaky STEM pipeline concept. The metaphor of the leaky pipeline has been used to describe how women drop out of STEM fields at all stages of their careers. In the U.S., out of 2,000 high school aged persons, 1944 were enrolled in high school fall 2014. Assuming equal enrollment for boys and girls, 60 boys and 62 girls are considered "gifted." By comparing enrollment to the population of persons 20–24 years old, 880 of the 1000 original women, and 654 of the original 1000 men will enroll in college (2014). In freshman year 330 women and 320 men will express an intent to study science or engineering. Of these only 142 women and 135 men will actually obtain a bachelor's degree in science or engineering, and only 7 women and 10 men will obtain a PhD in science or engineering.

Psychological

Lack of interest 
A meta-analysis concluded that men prefer working with things and women prefer working with people. When interests were classified by RIASEC type (Realistic, Investigative, Artistic, Social, Enterprising, Conventional), men showed stronger Realistic and Investigative interests, and women showed stronger Artistic, Social, and Conventional interests. Sex differences favoring men were also found for more specific measures of engineering, science, and mathematics interests.

In a 3-year interview study, Seymour and Hewitt (1997) found that perceptions that non-STEM academic majors offered better education options and better matched their interests was the most common (46%) reason provided by female students for switching majors from STEM areas to non-STEM areas. The second most frequently cited reason given for switching to non-STEM areas was a reported loss of interest in the women's chosen STEM majors. Additionally, 38% of female students who remained in STEM majors expressed concerns that there were other academic areas that might be a better fit for their interests. Preston's (2004) survey of 1,688 individuals who had left sciences also showed that 30 percent of the women endorsed "other fields more interesting" as their reason for leaving.

Advanced math skills do not often lead women to be interested in a STEM career. A Statistics Canada survey found that even young women of high mathematical ability are much less likely to enter a STEM field than young men of similar or even lesser ability.

A 2018 study originally claimed that countries with more gender equality had fewer women in science, technology, engineering and mathematics (STEM) fields. Some commentators argued that this was evidence of gender differences arising in more progressive countries, the so-called gender-equality paradox. However, a 2019 correction to the study outlined that the authors had created a previously undisclosed and unvalidated method to measure "propensity" of women and men to attain a higher degree in STEM, as opposed to the originally claimed measurement of "women’s share of STEM degrees". Harvard researchers were unable to independently recreate the data reported in the study. A follow-up paper by the researchers who discovered the discrepancy found conceptual and empirical problems with the gender-equality paradox in STEM hypothesis.

Lack of confidence 

According to A. N. Pell, the pipeline has several major leaks spanning the time from elementary school to retirement. One of the most important periods is adolescence. One of the factors behind girls' lack of confidence might be unqualified or ineffective teachers. Teachers' gendered perceptions on their students' capabilities can create an unbalanced learning environment and deter girls from pursuing further STEM education. They can also pass these stereotyped beliefs onto their students. Studies have also shown that student-teacher interactions affect girls' engagement with STEM. Teachers often give boys more opportunity to figure out the solution to a problem by themselves while telling the girls to follow the rules. Teachers are also more likely to accept questions from boys while telling girls to wait for their turns. This is partly due to gender expectations that boys will be active but that girls will be quiet and obedient. Prior to 1985, girls were provided fewer laboratory opportunities than boys. In middle and high school, science, mathematics, mechanics and computers courses are mainly taken by male students and also tend to be taught by male teachers. A lack of opportunities in STEM fields could lead to a loss of self-esteem in math and science abilities, and low self-esteem could prevent people from entering science and math fields.

One study found that women steer away from STEM fields because they believe they are not qualified for them; the study suggested that this could be fixed by encouraging girls to participate in more mathematics classes.  Out of STEM-intending students, 35% of women stated that their reason for leaving calculus was due to lack of understanding the material, while only 14% of men stated the same. The study reports that this difference in reason for leaving calculus is thought to develop from women's low level of confidence in their ability, and not actual skill. This study continues to establish that women and men have different levels of confidence in their ability and that confidence is related to how individual's performance in STEM fields. It was seen in another study that when men and women of equal math ability were asked to rate their own ability, women will rate their own ability at a much lower level. Programs with the purpose to reduce anxiety in math or increase confidence have a positive impact on women continuing their pursuit of a career in the STEM field.
Not only can the issue of confidence keep women from even entering STEM fields, but even women in upper-level courses with higher skill are more strongly affected by the stereotype that they (by nature) do not possess innate ability to succeed. This can cause a negative effect on confidence for women despite making it through courses designed to filter students out of the field. Being chronically outnumbered and underestimated can fuel feelings of imposter syndrome reported by many women in the STEAM field.

Stereotype threat
Stereotype threat arises from the fear that one's actions will confirm a negative stereotype about one's in-group. This fear creates additional stress, consuming valuable cognitive resources and lowering task performance in the threatened domain. Individuals are susceptible to stereotype threat whenever they are assessed in a domain for which there is a perceived negative stereotype about a group to which they belong. Stereotype threat undermines the academic performance of women and girls in math and science, which leads to an underestimation of abilities in these subjects by standard measures of academic achievement. Individuals who identify strongly with a certain area (e.g., math) are more likely to have their performance in that area hampered by stereotype threat than those who identify less strongly with the area. This means that even highly motivated students from negatively stereotyped groups are likely to be adversely affected by stereotype threat and thus may come to disengage from the stereotyped domain.
Negative stereotypes about girls’ capabilities in mathematics and science drastically lower their performance in mathematics and science courses as well as their interest in pursuing a STEM career. Studies have found that gender differences in performance disappear if students are told that there are no gender differences on a particular mathematics test. This indicates that the learning environment can greatly impact success in a course.

Stereotype threat has been criticized on a theoretical basis. Several attempts to replicate its experimental evidence have failed. The findings in support of the concept have been suggested to be the product of publication bias.

A study was done to determine how stereotype threat and math identification can affect women who were majoring in a STEM related field. There were three different situations, designed to test the impact of stereotype on performance in math. One group of women were informed that men had previously out-performed women on the same calculus test they were about to take. The next group was told men and women had performed at the same level. The last group was told nothing about how men had performed and there was no mention of gender before taking their test. Out of these situations, women performed at their best scores when there was no mention of gender. The worst scores were from the situation where women were told that men had performed better than women. For women to pursue the male-dominated field of STEM, previous research shows that they must have more confidence in math/science ability.

Innate versus learned skill

Some studies propose the explanation that STEM fields (and especially fields like physics, math and philosophy) are considered by both teachers and students to require more innate talent than skills that can be learned. Combined with a tendency to view women as having less of the required innate abilities, researchers proposed that this can result in assessing women as less qualified for STEM positions. In a study done by Ellis, Fosdick and Rasmussen, it was concluded that without strong skills in calculus, women cannot perform as well as their male counterparts in any field of STEM, which leads to the fewer women pursuing a career in these fields. A high percentage of women that do pursue a career in STEM do not continue on this pathway after taking Calculus I, which was found to be a class that weeds out students from the STEM pathway.

There have been several controversial statements about innate ability and success in STEM. A few notable examples include Lawrence Summers, former president of Harvard University who suggested cognitive ability at high end positions could cause a population difference. Summers later stepped down as president. Former Google engineer, James Damore, wrote a memo entitled Google's Ideological Echo Chamber suggesting that differences in trait distributions between men and women was a reason for gender imbalance in STEM. The memo stated that affirmative action to reduce the gap could discriminate against highly qualified male candidates. Damore was fired for sending out this memo.

Comparative advantage
A 2019 study by two Paris economists suggests that women's under-representation in STEM fields could be the result of comparative advantage, caused not by girls' 10% lower performance on math tests, but rather their far superior reading performance, which, when taken together with their math performance, results in almost one standard deviation better overall performance than boys, which is theorized to make women more likely to study humanities-related subjects than math-related ones.

The current gender gap, however, is widely considered to be economically inefficient overall.

Strategies for increasing representation of women 

There are a multitude of factors that may explain the low representation of women in STEM careers. Anne-Marie Slaughter, the first woman to hold the position of Director of Policy Planning for the United States Department of State, has recently suggested some strategies to the corporate and political environment to support women to fulfill to the best of their abilities the many roles and responsibilities that they undertake. The academic and research environment for women may benefit by applying some of the suggestions she has made to help women excel, while maintaining a work-life balance.

Social-psychological interventions
A number of researchers have tested interventions to alleviate stereotype threat for women in situations where their math and science skills are being evaluated. The hope is that by combating stereotype threat, these interventions will boost women's performance, encouraging a greater number of them to persist in STEM careers.

One simple intervention is simply educating individuals about the existence of stereotype threat. Researchers found that women who were taught about stereotype threat and how it could negatively impact women's performance in math performed as well as men on a math test, even when stereotype threat was induced. These women also performed better than women who were not taught about stereotype threat before they took the math test.

Role models
One of the proposed methods for alleviating stereotype threat is through introducing role models. One study found that women who took a math test that was administered by a female experimenter did not suffer a drop in performance when compared to women whose test was administered by a male experimenter. Additionally, these researchers found that it was not the physical presence of the female experimenter but rather learning about her apparent competence in math that buffered participants against stereotype threat. 
The findings of another study suggest that role models do not necessarily have to be individuals with authority or high status, but can also be drawn from peer groups. This study found that girls in same-gender groups performed better on a task that measured math skills than girls in mixed-gender groups. This was due to the fact that girls in the same-gender groups had greater access to positive role models, in the form of their female classmates who excelled in math, than girls in mixed-gender groups. 
Similarly, another experiment showed that making groups achievements salient helped buffer women against stereotype threat. Female participants who read about successful women, even though these successes were not directly related to performance in math, performed better on a subsequent math test than participants who read about successful corporations rather than successful women. 
A study investigating the role of textbook images on science performance found that women demonstrated better comprehension of a passage from a chemistry lesson when the text was accompanied by a counter-stereotypic image (i.e., of a female scientist) than when the text was accompanied by a stereotypic image (i.e., of a male scientist).
Other scholars distinguish between the challenges of both recruitment and retention in increasing women's participation in STEM fields. These researchers suggest that although both female and male role models can be effective in recruiting women to STEM fields, female role models are more effective at promoting the retention of women in these fields. Female teachers can also act as role models for young girls. Reports have shown that the presence of female teachers positively influences girls' perceptions of STEM and increases their interest in STEM careers.

Self-affirmation
Researchers have investigated the usefulness of self-affirmation in alleviating stereotype threat. One study found that women who affirmed a personal value prior to experiencing stereotype threat performed as well on a math test as men and as women who did not experience stereotype threat. A subsequent study found that a short writing exercise in which college students, who were enrolled in an introductory physics course, wrote about their most important values substantially decreased the gender performance gap and boosted women's grades. Scholars believe that the effectiveness of such values-affirmation exercises is their ability to help individuals view themselves as complex individuals, rather than through the lens of a harmful stereotype. Supporting this hypothesis, another study found that women who were encouraged to draw self-concept maps with many nodes did not experience a performance decrease on a math test. However, women who did not draw self-concept maps or only drew maps with a few nodes did perform significantly worse than men on the math test. The effect of these maps with many nodes was to remind women of their "multiple roles and identities," that were unrelated to, and would thus not be harmed by, their performance on the math test.

Organized efforts 
To increase women's enrollment in the STEM field, researchers believe that it should occur in elementary and middle schools. Gender differences are evident by kindergarten, and many children have developed an attitude towards math and their career. According to a study about high school and middle school students, there is evidence of a gender gap in science and math test scores. Another method to reduce the gender gap is to create communities and opportunities apart from school. For instance, creating a residential program, women's only college, and  affiliation between high school and college for STEM programs will help eliminate the gender gap. The research has shown that gender gap in STEM might be because of unsupportive culture that hurts woman's advancement in their career. Therefore, women all over the United States are underrepresented in tenure faculty and leadership positions.

Organizations such as Girls Who Code, StemBox, Blossom, Engineer Girl, Girls Can Code in Afghanistan, @IndianGirlsCode, Stanford's Women in Data Science Initiative, and Kode with Klossy (spearheaded by supermodel Karlie Kloss) aim to encourage women and girls to explore male-dominated STEM fields. Many of these organizations offer summer programs and scholarships to girls interested in STEM fields. Other efforts like, Girls’ Day, exists in the Netherlands. During Girls' Day, beta, technical, IT companies and technical or IT departments from companies open their doors to girls from 10 to 15 years old throughout the Netherlands. The girls can participate in interesting activities, meet female employees and learn more about STEM activities and experience the undiscovered world of science, technology and IT up close.

The U.S. government has funded similar endeavors; the Department of State's Bureau of Educational and Cultural Affairs created TechGirls and TechWomen, exchange programs which teach Middle Eastern and North African girls and women skills valuable in STEM fields and encourage them to pursue STEM careers. There is also the TeachHer Initiative, spearheaded by UNESCO, Costa Rican First Lady, Mercedes Peñas Domingo, and Jill Biden which aims to close the gender gap in STEAM curricula and careers. The Initiative also emphasizes the importance of after school activities and clubs for girls. That’s why Dell Technologies teamed up with Microsoft and Intel in 2019 to create an after-school program for young girls and underserved K-12 students across the U.S. and Canada called Girls Who Game (GWG). The program uses Minecraft: Education Edition as a tool to teach the girls communication, collaboration, creativity, and critical thinking skills.

Current campaigns to increase women's participation within STEM fields include the UK's WISE as well as mentoring programs, such as the Million Women Mentors initiative connecting girls and young women with STEM mentors, GlamSci, and Verizon's #InspireHerMind project. The US Office of Science and Technology Policy during the Obama administration collaborated with the White House Council on Women and Girls to increase the participation of women and girls within STEM fields along with the "Educate to Innovate" campaign.

In August 2019, the University of Technology Sydney announced that women, or anyone with a long term educational disadvantage, applying to the Faculty of Engineering and Information Technology, and for a construction project management degree in the Faculty of Design, Architecture and Building, will be required to have a minimum Australian Tertiary Admission Rank that is ten points lower than that required of other students.

Programs such as FIRST(For Inspiration and Recognition of Science and Technology) are constantly working to eliminate the gender gap in computer science. FIRST is a robotic and research platform for students from kindergarten through  high school. The activities and competitions  in the program are usually about current STEM problems. According to the report, around 13.7 percent of men and 2.6 percent of women entering college hope to major in engineering. In contrast, 67  percent of men and 47 percent of women who engaged in the FIRST program  tend to major in engineering.

See also

 Sex and intelligence
 International Conference of Women Engineers and Scientists
 Women in science
 Women in computing
 Association for Women in Science
 Association for Women in Mathematics
 Stereotype threat
 Pygmalion effect
 Black sheep effect
 Beyond Bias and Barriers
 Implicit stereotypes
 Glass ceiling
 Inequality in the workplace
 STEM fields
 Heuristics in judgment and decision making
 :Category:Organizations for women in science and technology
 Margaret W. Rossiter History of Women in Science Prize
 Matilda effect
 Social norm
 African women in engineering

References

Notes

Sources

Further reading 
 American Association of University Women (2010).  Why So Few?
American Association of University Women - official website and career development grants for women: 
 Workforce Innovation and Opportunity Act
 Natarajan, Priyamvada, "Calculating Women" (review of Margot Lee Shetterly, Hidden Figures:  The American Dream and the Untold Story of the Black Women Mathematicians Who Helped Win the Space Race, William Morrow; Dava Sobel, The Glass Universe:  How the Ladies of the Harvard Observatory Took the Measure of the Stars, Viking; and Nathalia Holt, Rise of the Rocket Girls:  The Women Who Propelled Us, from Missiles to the Moon to Mars, Little, Brown), The New York Review of Books, vol. LXIV, no. 9 (25 May 2017), pp. 38–39.
World Economic Forum "Global Gender Gap 2020"
Campero S. 2020. "Hiring and Intra-occupational Gender Segregation in Software Engineering." American Sociological Review.

Engineering education
Role status
Stereotypes of women
Science education
Statistics of education
STEM
American Association of University Women
Women engineers
Women in mathematics